Scrobipalpa halophila is a moth in the family Gelechiidae. It was described by Povolný in 1973. It is found in Turkey.

The forewings are whitish with three black marks. The hindwings are dirty whitish.

References

Scrobipalpa
Moths described in 1973